

The Baumgärtl PB-64 was a 1950s single-seat helicopter designed and built by the Austrian-designer Paul Baumgärtl for the Brazilian Air Ministry. The PB-64 had an unusual rotor drive with two lightweight pulse jets mounted on the rotor, although not on the tips of the blades which was more normal.  The engines were mounted at each end of a bar, at right-angles to the main rotor which also acted as a stabilizer bar.  The main structure was a simple keel with a tricycle landing gear and an open seat for the pilot and a rudder on a simple tail boom.

Specifications

See also

References

Notes

Bibliography

1950s Brazilian civil utility aircraft
1950s Brazilian helicopters
PB-64